Marcellus Dorwin was a member of the Wisconsin State Assembly.

Biography
Dorwin was born on February 14, 1861, in Durand (town), Wisconsin. His father, Vivus Wright Dorwin, was also a member of the Assembly. The younger Dorwin attended what would become Gale College and what is now Valparaiso University. He died in 1925.

Political career
Dorwin was elected to the Assembly in 1924. Additionally, he was Town Chairman (similar to Mayor) of Durand and Chairman of the Pepin County, Wisconsin Board of Supervisors. He was a Republican.

References

People from Durand, Wisconsin
Republican Party members of the Wisconsin State Assembly
Mayors of places in Wisconsin
County supervisors in Wisconsin
Gale College alumni
Valparaiso University alumni
Millers
1861 births
1925 deaths